Macfusion was an open-source network file-system client, based on FUSE, CurlFtpFS and SSHFS.

See also

Filesystem in Userspace (FUSE)
ExpanDrive
WebDrive

References

External links
Macfusion official site
Macfusion discussion group
Macfusion compiled for 64-bit systems

Free FTP clients
Free special-purpose file systems
Userspace file systems